The Blockkogel is a mountain in the Geigenkamm group of the Ötztal Alps.

See also
 List of mountains of the Alps

External links
 "Blockkogel" on Mountain-forecast

Mountains of Tyrol (state)
Mountains of the Alps
Alpine three-thousanders
Ötztal Alps